Gareth Davies (born 2 March 1984) is a Welsh rugby union player. An outside half, he currently plays his club rugby for Merthyr RFC, after beginning his career with Penallta RFC then to Cardiff RFC. He has been selected for the Wales national rugby sevens team squad.

References

1984 births
Living people
Rugby union players from Caerphilly
Welsh rugby union players
Cardiff RFC players
Male rugby sevens players
Rugby sevens players at the 2014 Commonwealth Games
Commonwealth Games rugby sevens players of Wales
Rugby sevens players at the 2010 Commonwealth Games